The 1988–89 Norwegian 1. Divisjon season was the 50th season of ice hockey in Norway. Ten teams participated in the league, and Sparta Sarpsborg won the championship.

Regular season

Playoffs

External links 
 Norwegian Ice Hockey Federation

Nor
1988-89
GET